Rise is an album by Anoushka Shankar released on 27 September 2005. The album was chosen as one of Amazon.com's Top 100 Editor's Picks of 2005 (#82). On previous recordings, Anoushka Shankar had followed in the footsteps of her father, Ravi Shankar, by performing relatively traditional, raga-based music. Rise, by contrast, incorporated jazz, pop, and pan-ethnic world music textures in an unpredictable melange. At the center of it all are Shankar's sitar expertise and traditional Indian roots.

Track listing

Personnel 
Anoushka Shankar: Sitar, keyboards, vocals
Vishwa Mohan Bhatt: Veena
Rajendra Prasanna: Shehnai
Barry Phillips: Cello
Pedro Eustache: Bansuri, duduk
Ajay Prasanna: Bansuri
Pedro Ricardo Mino: Piano
Pulak Sarcar: Keyboards
Kevin Cooper: Bass guitar
Jesse Charnow: Drums and percussion
Tanmoy Bose: Djembe, tabla
Sanjeev Chimmalgi: Backing vocals
Ritesh Mishra: Backing vocals
Rajneesh Mishra: Backing vocals

Charts

References

Anoushka Shankar albums
2005 albums